The Savannah Avenue Historic District is a  historic district in Statesboro, Georgia which was listed on the National Register of Historic Places in 1996.  It then included 49 contributing buildings and 29 non-contributing ones.

It includes the Donehoo-Brannen House, 332 Savannah Avenue, separately listed on the NRHP, which was designed by Edward C. Hosford & Company.

Houses at 322, 326, and 340 Savannah Avenue were designed by architect Walter Alred.

References

External links
 

Historic districts on the National Register of Historic Places in Georgia (U.S. state)
Colonial Revival architecture in Georgia (U.S. state)
Tudor Revival architecture in the United States
Buildings and structures completed in 1920
National Register of Historic Places in Bulloch County, Georgia